Alcippe may refer to:

Alcippe (bird), a genus of birds in the  Pellorneidae (ground-babbler) family
Alcippe (Greek mythology) or Alkippê, the name of seven figures in Greek mythology
Alcippe (Greek hero) daughter of Peleus and Thetis

See also
 Pseudoalcippe, a monotypic genus of bird